La Rosière de Pessac (The Virgin of Pessac) is the title of two hour-long films directed by Jean Eustache (in 1968 and 1979 respectively).  The films cover an annual ceremony, held in Eustache's place of birth, in which the mayor and his associates nominate a girl as the town's most virtuous.  Thus, the girls chosen in those two years are eponymous subjects of these documentaries.

External links
 
 

1968 films
1979 films
1960s French-language films
French documentary films
Films directed by Jean Eustache
1960s French films
1970s French films